Mulenga is a name of Zambian origin that may refer to:

Given name:
Kampamba Mulenga Chilumba (born 1976), Zambian politician
Mulenga Kapwepwe (born 1958), Zambian author
Mulenga Mulenga (born 1987), Zambian painter, writer, sculptor and photographer
Alice Mulenga Lenshina (1920–1978), Zambian prisoner of conscience
Mulenga Lubusha (1920–1978), Zambian Christian religious leader

Surname:
Anita Mulenga (born 1995), Zambian footballer who plays as a defender for the Zambia women's national team
Augustine Mulenga (born 1990), Zambian football player
Bejay Mulenga (born 1995), British entrepreneur
Charity Basaza Mulenga (born 1979), Ugandan electrical engineer and academic administrator
Chongo Mulenga (born 1998), Zambian male badminton player
Clifford Mulenga (born 1987), Zambian footballer
Emmanuel Mulenga (born 1979), Zambian politician
Eston Mulenga (1967–1993), Zambian footballer 
Everisto Mulenga (born 1999), Zambian amateur boxer
Ghost Mulenga (1954–1985), Zambian goalkeeper
Jacob Mulenga (born 1984), Zambian former footballer
Joseph Mulenga ((died 2012), Ugandan judge
Justin Mulenga (1955–2020), Zambian Roman Catholic bishop
Kapambwe Mulenga (1963–1996), Zambian footballer 
Leonard Mulenga (born 1997), Zambian footballer
Mukuka Mulenga (born 1993), Zambian footballer 
Mutale Mulenga (born 1967), Zambian athlete
Nyambe Mulenga (born 1987),  former Zambian footballer
Timothy Mulenga, Zambian author and social justice activist
Webster Mulenga (born 1993)), Zambian footballer

Ugandan names
Zambian surnames
Zambian given names
Bemba-language surnames
Bemba-language given names